Li Shulei (born January 1964) is a Chinese politician who is the current head of the Publicity Department of the Central Committee of the Chinese Communist Party and a member of the Politburo of the Chinese Communist Party. Previously, he served as the executive vice president of the Central Party School (ministerial level position) and the deputy executive head of the Publicity Department. Li spent most of his career in academia, before being dispatched for a short stint as head of the propaganda department in Fujian, then as head of discipline inspection in Beijing. He is an important advisor to CCP general secretary and paramount leader Xi Jinping.

Biography
Li was born in Yuanyang County, Henan province. He entered Peking University in 1978 at the age of 14, studying library sciences.  By the time he was 21, he already held a master's degree from Peking University.  By age 24, Li earned a doctorate in modern Chinese literature from Peking University.

In December 1989, he was transferred to work in the Central Party School of the Chinese Communist Party. By 1995, Li was named a professor at the party school. He taught literary history.  During his tenure as a professor, he wrote  essays and critiques on ancient and modern Chinese literature.  Between 2001 and 2008, he served on the governing board of the school, serving as the director of the Literary History, Training, and Education Affairs departments.

During this time, he served in two guazhi positions, as the deputy party secretary of Qinglong Manchu Autonomous County, Hebei, and in 2004, as the deputy party secretary of Xi'an.  In December 2008, he was named vice president of the Central Party School, ascending to the vice-ministerial rank, and working directly under then-Central Party School president Xi Jinping.

In January 2014, he was named a member of the provincial Party Standing Committee of Fujian, and the head of party propaganda in the province. This was his first provincial tenure. His rise in politics had been compared to that of Wang Huning, another political heavyweight whose career originated in academia. Li supports party leader Xi's philosophy that "the party must guide the arts."

In January 2016, Li was named Secretary of CCP Discipline Inspection of Beijing. In January 2017, Li was named Deputy Secretary of the Central Commission for Discipline Inspection.

Li is a member of the 18th and 19th CCP Central Commissions for Discipline Inspection. In 2020, he was appointed as the "vice president in charge of daily work" (ministerial level position) of the Central Party School (Chinese Academy of Governance).

References

External links
Official biography Ce.cn 2014-05-07

Peking University alumni
Academic staff of the Central Party School of the Chinese Communist Party
1964 births
People's Republic of China politicians from Henan
People from Xinxiang
Members of the 20th Politburo of the Chinese Communist Party
Living people